14 Street W is the name of two major arterial roads and a short collector road in Calgary, Alberta. Separated by the Elbow River and the West Nose Creek valley.  Originally proposed as a continuous route and north-south freeway, plans were cancelled in favor of 24 Street W, which became Crowchild Trail.

Route description

Southern segment 
The south segment begins at Canyon Meadows Drive and is an expressway between Anderson Road and Glenmore Trail, passing by Heritage Park Historical Village and Rockyview General Hospital.  14 Street SW is part of bypass route which connects Highway 1 west and Highway 2 south, as well as part of a major north-south corridor which includes portions of Macleod Trail, Anderson Road, Glenmore Trail, and Crowchild Trail.

The transitway, which carries MAX Yellow and MAX Teal, begins just west of 14 Street SW at the intersection of 75 Avenue SW and Eagle Ridge Drive near Rockyview General Hospital, and travels parallel to 14 Street SW, ending at the intersection Southland Drive and Bradbury Drive.

Central segment 
The central portion of 14 Street W travels between the communities of Altadore and Elbow Park in the south and Hidden Valley in the north, passing through Calgary's inner city west of downtown. A short segment intersects 50 Avenue SW at the south end of River Park, providing access to the Emily Follensbee School. The arterial road starts at the north end of the park, at the intersection of 38 Avenue SW as 14 Street SW and travels north where it crosses the Bow River on the Mewata Bridge and becomes 14 Street NW.  It continues north past SAIT and North Hill Centre, crossing 16 Avenue NW (Highway 1) and John Laurie Boulevard.  It continues along the eastern edge of Nose Hill Park, ending in the community of Hidden Valley north of Country Hills Boulevard.

14 Street W used to be part of Highway 1A between 9 Avenue SW and 16 Avenue NW, but the designation was dropped in the 1970s.

Northern segment 
The extreme northern portion of 14 Street NW connects the communities of Panorama Hills and Evanston.  The northern segment is split by Stoney Trail, where ramps allow for right-in/right-out access; however grading is in place for a future partial-cloverleaf interchange.  North of Symons Valley Parkway, 14 Street NW becomes a rural road and ends at the Calgary city limits at the Highway 566 intersection; continuing as Range Road 14 in Rocky View County.  The roadway will be expanded to a four lane, arterial road as the future community of Keystone Hills, located to the east, is developed.

Major intersections 
From south to north.

See also 

Transportation in Calgary

References 

Roads in Calgary